Mantes-la-Jolie is a railway station in the town Mantes-la-Jolie, Yvelines department, northwestern France. It is on the Paris–Le Havre railway at the point where the line to Caen and Cherbourg diverges.

Services

The station is served by several TGV trains from Le Havre and Cherbourg to Paris and further (Lyon, Marseille). Besides regional Transilien trains, TER Normandie trains to Rouen and Évreux also call here. The station is planned to be the future terminus of the RER E connecting with Haussmann – Saint-Lazare and the rest of the line.

References

External links

 
 

Railway stations in Yvelines
Railway stations in France opened in 1843